Star Blazers consists of three television seasons. Each is an English-language adaption of its Japanese Space Battleship Yamato counterpart. However, the Japanese saga entails more than just these three television seasons, and part of this missing portion of the saga occurs between Seasons 2 and 3.

Series overview

Episodes

Season 1 
Star Blazers Season 1 is a straightforward English language adaption of the first Japanese Space Battleship Yamato television season. The plot opens in 2199, with planet Earth facing extinction within one year due to radioactive pollution caused by "planet bombs", the weapon of a blue-skinned, humanoid alien race known as the Gamilons. A message arrives from Queen Starsha of planet Iscandar, providing Earth with plans to build a superluminal engine and the promise that, if Earthlings can reach Iscandar, enduring what obstacles the Gamilons might put in their way, the Queen will give them a machine—the Cosmo DNA—that can neutralize the deadly radioactivity and restore the Earth's ecosystem. The challenge borne by the crew of the Yamato is to travel 148,000 light years to Iscandar and back to Earth in one Earth year.

Season 2 
Like its predecessor, Star Blazers Season 2 is an adaption of the Japanese Space Battleship Yamato II television season. The plot opens in 2201, one year after the Star Force's successful mission to Iscandar. At peace and complacent, Earth receives a mysterious, extraterrestrial radio signal from Trelaina of planet Telezart which turns out to be desperate warning of a new enemy, the Comet Empire. The Empire is mostly peopled by a race of green-skinned humanoids led by the evil Prince Zordar and his daughter, Princess Invidia. Their center of operations is a huge, mechanized fortress designed to resemble a giant comet. Cloaked in an enormous plasma field, the fortress is capable of obliterating entire planets by means of head-on collision, and it is quickly approaching Earth. Unknown to Earth, the Star Force's old enemy, Desslok of Gamilon, has joined forces with the Comet Empire, and is plotting his revenge. The Earth Defence Council (EDC) dismisses Trelaina's radio transmission, and the Star Force members, now assigned to other posts, are the only ones who believe there is a danger, and face the prospect of committing mutiny in order to defend Earth.

Season 3 
Star Blazers Season 3 is an adaption of the Japanese Space Battleship Yamato III television season. The plot of Season 3 opens at an undisclosed date, but presumably in 2203 or later. It concerns the travails of Earth and its Star Force as they get drawn into a galaxy-wide war between two enormous empires—the Galmans (the reformed Gamilon Empire) and the Bolar Federation.

The plot was altered slightly from original Japanese script to account for flashback footage from the Japanese films, Yamato: The New Voyage. New Voyage and its sequel, Be Forever Yamato, which occur between Seasons 2 and 3, but were not aired in America, nor seen by most American fans. The films deal with the Gamilons and the Earthlings as they combine forces to fight the Dark Nebula Empire. The script of Season 3 was altered in those scenes to state (incorrectly) that the enemy was a remnant of the Comet Empire.

Season 3 was adapted into English several years after the first two seasons, and uses a different voice cast. It also saw a very limited release, airing in syndication in handful of markets. As such, it did not receive a wide release until the early 90s when it was released on VHS as "Starblazers: The Lost Episodes".

References

Star Blazers